Cabela's Dangerous Hunts 2009 (known as Cabela's Dangerous Adventures in the PAL region) is a hunting video game published by Activision for the PlayStation 2, PlayStation 3, Wii and Xbox 360 game consoles. It was released in the United States on September 23, 2008.

Reception

IGN gave the game a 5.2/10, giving mediocre marks for its novelty appeal, but reported for the Xbox 360 version, "... it has very little lasting appeal and is definitely a better rental than a purchase." IGN gave the Wii version a lower score by a point, citing the poor control scheme that was implemented.

References

2008 video games
Activision games
PlayStation 2 games
PlayStation 3 games
Video games developed in Romania
Xbox 360 games
Video games set in Russia
Video games set in Tanzania
Video games set in Alaska
Video games set in Canada
Video games set in Thailand
Video games set in India
Video games set in Namibia
Video games set in Africa
Video games set in South America
Video games developed in the United States
Fun Labs games
Single-player video games
Sand Grain Studios games
Magic Wand Productions games
Wii Zapper games